Belle d'Eau is an unincorporated community in Avoyelles Parish, Louisiana, United States.

Unincorporated communities in Louisiana
Unincorporated communities in Avoyelles Parish, Louisiana